Nagina Rai was an Indian politician. He was elected to the Lok Sabha, the lower house of the Parliament of India from Gopalganj, Bihar. He was murdered on 10 April 1991.

See also
 List of assassinated Indian politicians

References

1991 deaths
Year of birth missing
Assassinated Indian politicians
Janata Dal politicians
Indian National Congress politicians
Lok Sabha members from Bihar
India MPs 1980–1984